Dale W. Berry (born April 20, 1960) is a commercial artist and designer in San Francisco, California, who is best known for his work on the graphic novel series Tales of the Moonlight Cutter, which is published by his company, Myriad Publications.

Berry also created Ninja Funnies for Eternity Comics, and the character Dragonhead with co-creator Eric Dinehart.

In addition to his work in commercial art and graphic novels, Berry is a professional fencing instructor and hosted a weekly radio program on KRZR.

External links
Myriad Publications
Dale Berry page on KRZR.com
 Fresno Bee interview
Black Belt Magazine review of "Tales of the Moonlight Cutter"

Notes and references

Living people
1960 births